Joseph E. Bates (May 5, 1837 – September 22, 1900) was an American politician who served on the city council and as mayor.

Bates was born in Chautauqua County, New York, and raised in Muskegon County, Michigan. He moved to Denver, Colorado in 1860, where he became involved in working for various businesses. He became active in city politics being elected a city councilor in 1868. Bates established enterprises including the Denver Brewery, Denver Pacific Railroad, and the Denver Smelting and Refining Works. Joseph E. Bates was twice elected Mayor of Denver, in 1872 and again in 1885.

See also
 List of mayors of Denver

References

1837 births
1900 deaths
Colorado Mining Boom
American brewers
Mayors of Denver
Colorado Republicans
People from Chautauqua County, New York
People from Muskegon County, Michigan
19th-century American politicians
19th-century American businesspeople